The list of ship commissionings in 1998 includes a chronological list of all ships commissioned in 1998.


See also 

1998